The Wayfaring Stranger (Asch 345) is an album consisting of three 10-inch, 78 rpm records by Burl Ives released on Asch in 1944. It should not be confused with Ives' 1944 album for Columbia Records (C-103) – also called The Wayfaring Stranger and itself a re-release of a 1941 album on Okeh Records – which contains different songs. The Asch album includes the first releases of two signature songs by Ives: "Poor Wayfaring Stranger" and "The Blue Tail Fly."

The same collection of songs was reissued in 1947 on the Stinson label as a 78-rpm album (Stinson 345), then a 10-inch LP (Stinson SLP-1) in 1949, a 12-inch LP c. 1954 (also with catalog number Stinson SLP-1), retitled Blue Tail Fly and Other Favorites, and finally a cassette tape (Stinson CA-1). All of the Stinson releases with the exception of the 78-rpm album had two bonus tracks: "The Fox" and "Brennan on the Moor."

In 1948 Burl Ives also released an autobiography with the same title.

Track listing

Track listing

References

1944 albums
Burl Ives albums